Fairview Cemetery, also known as Fairview Memorial Park and Mausoleum, is a burial ground in Fairview, Bergen County, New Jersey in the United States, located on the western slopes of the Hudson Palisades. It is bordered by North Bergen, Broad Avenue, and Fairview Avenue, across from which is Mount Moriah Cemetery. The New York, Susquehanna and Western Railroad right-of-way at western portal of the Edgewater Tunnel passes through the cemetery.

Notable interments
There are several graves of Spanish–American War veterans in the cemetery.

Among others interred are:
 August Chandron (1866–1947), United States Navy Medal of Honor recipient
 Alexander Esau (1957–1977), Murder victim of serial killer David Berkowitz, aka Son of Sam
 Willie Garoni (1877–1914), Professional baseball player
 Ray Gillen (1959–1993), American rock singer
 Gilbert Hatfield (1855–1921), Major League baseball player
 James Jonas Madison (1884–1922), World War I Medal of Honor recipient
 John Marin (1870–1953), American artist
 Willard Marshall (1921–2000), Major League baseball player
 Eddie August Schneider (1911–1940), American aviator
 Isabel Patterson Springer (1880–1917), Socialite and subject of book Murder at Brown Palace
 Marshall Van Winkle (1869–1957), United States Congressman

See also
 List of New Jersey cemeteries
 List of cemeteries in Hudson County, New Jersey

References 

Cemeteries in Bergen County, New Jersey
Fairview, Bergen County, New Jersey